The New Zealand Blood Service (in te reo Māori) is the provider of blood services for New Zealand. The service is a Crown entity responsible to New Zealand’s Parliament and is governed by a Board appointed by the Minister of Health.

History
The New Zealand Blood Service (NZBS) was formed on 1 July 1998, when the Health Amendment Act 1998 was passed by Parliament. NZBS was created to provide the people of New Zealand with safe, appropriate and timely access to blood and tissue products and related services to meet their health needs. NZBS is responsible for the development of an integrated national blood transfusion process from the collection of blood from volunteer donors to the transfusion of blood products within the hospital environment – a 'vein to vein' transfusion service.

Approximately 29,000 New Zealanders need blood or blood products every year and less than 4% of New Zealanders donate.

In November 2020, Organ Donation New Zealand became part of the NZBS.

On 14 December 2020, the NZBS amended its donation policies to reduce the blood deferral period for gay and bisexual men as well as male sex workers from 12 to 3 months.

Duties

New Zealand Blood Service has four key roles:
 Blood collection, based on voluntary, unpaid donations;
 Processing of blood donations, by separating blood donations into blood components;
 Accreditation testing of blood donations, to minimise risk to the recipients of blood and blood products;
 Blood banking at hospital-based laboratories, where blood products are tested pre-transfusion and matched to each individual patient.

Blood collection

New Zealand Blood Service plans and forecasts demand from hospitals and uses this to calculate the number of appointments and donations required for the week, based on blood type. Blood type is key, as donations are matched to the blood types of the patients being treated in hospitals.

Each year NZBS collects approximately 106,000 whole blood donations, 110,000 plasma donations and 18,000 units of platelets.

NZBS has nine Donor Centres around New Zealand and runs over 300 mobile blood drives each year. The Donor Centres are in Auckland (Epsom, Manukau and North Shore), Hamilton, Tauranga, Palmerston North, Wellington, Christchurch and Dunedin. Mobile blood drives take place in community halls, education centres and workplaces. Whole blood donors can donate at a mobile blood drive or any of the nine Donor Centres. Plasma and platelet donations require an apheresis machine and so can only be made at nine Donor Centres with these facilities.

In order to minimise risk for recipients of blood and blood products, NZBS has detailed eligibility criteria in place for potential donors. These include a donor’s age, weight, health and travel history.

Processing of blood donations 
Blood donations are processed at four sites: Auckland, Hamilton, Wellington and Christchurch. These sites collectively process around 106,000 donations each year.

Processing involves the separation of blood donations into blood components: red cells, platelets and plasma.

Accreditation testing of blood donations 
Accreditation testing is centralised in Auckland and Christchurch. Accreditation testing of all blood donations involves two distinct processes: blood grouping and screening for infectious markers.

Blood banks 
Blood banks are the pre-transfusion testing laboratories where blood products are matched to suit each individual patient. This includes determining the patient's blood type and matching this with appropriate products.

Blood banks are always located at hospitals and are often staffed after hours to meet any urgent need for blood. NZBS operates six blood banks within hospitals across New Zealand. Within the 20 District Health Board (DHB) Blood Bank laboratories also perform pre-transfusion testing in line with defined quality standards.

References

External links
 

New Zealand Crown agents
Medical and health organisations based in New Zealand
Blood donation